Deepstep Creek is a stream in the U.S. state of Georgia.

Deepstep Creek was so named on account of steep banks along its course.

References

Rivers of Georgia (U.S. state)
Rivers of Washington County, Georgia